Ajah may refer to:

 Ajah (Genesis), a minor biblical figure
 Ajah (Wheel of Time), a subdivision of Aes Sedai society in the Wheel of Time series
 Ajah, Lagos, Nigeria
 American Journal of Ancient History

See also
 Aja (disambiguation)
 Ajahn, a Thai-language term meaning teacher